Waite Bellamy is an American former professional basketball player and coach. He played college basketball for the Florida A&M Rattlers and was a draft selection of the St. Louis Hawks in the 1963 NBA draft. Bellamy spent his entire professional career with the Wilmington / Delaware Blue Bombers of the Eastern Professional Basketball League where he won two championships. He was named as the league's Most Valuable Player in 1970. Bellamy worked as a teacher and basketball coach at high schools in Florida after his playing retirement.

High school career
Bellamy attended Lincoln High School in Palmetto, Florida. He averaged 25 points as a senior while his team finished the season with a 30–5 record and advanced to the state tournament. Bellamy also served as captain of the football team and president of the school's student body. He graduated in 1959.

College career
Bellamy did not receive any scholarships from major Southern colleges as they did not offer them to black players at the time. He went to Florida A&M University where the coaches gave him an offer of playing for the Rattlers in either football or basketball: he chose the latter. Bellamy tallied 1,600 points and was a three-time All-SIAC selection from 1961 to 1963. He set the Rattlers' single-game scoring record when he totalled 53 points against the Bethune–Cookman Wildcats.

Bellamy was inducted into the Florida A&M Athletics Hall of Fame in 1987. His number 25 jersey was retired by the Rattlers and hangs in the Al Lawson Center.

Professional career
Bellamy was selected by the St. Louis Hawks in the 4th round of the 1963 NBA draft but did not make the team. He instead joined the Wilmington Blue Bombers of the Eastern Professional Basketball League (EPBL) where he played for eight years. Bellamy was awarded as the EPBL Most Valuable Player in 1970 and earned three selections to the All-EPBL team. He won two championships with the Blue Bombers in 1966 and 1967. He led the league in scoring during the 1969–70 season with 838 points per game. Bellamy earned invitations to NBA training camps with the Philadelphia 76ers, Baltimore Bullets and New York Knicks during his EPBL career.

Post-playing career
Bellamy worked as a teacher and basketball coach in the Sarasota County school system for three decades.

Bellamy was inducted in the National Negro High School Basketball Hall of Fame in 2008 and the Florida Association of Basketball Coaches Court of Legends in 2016.

References

External links

Year of birth missing (living people)
African-American basketball coaches
African-American basketball players
American men's basketball coaches
American men's basketball players
Basketball coaches from Florida
Basketball players from Florida
Delaware Blue Bombers players
Florida A&M Rattlers basketball players
Guards (basketball)
High school basketball coaches in Florida
Sportspeople from Bradenton, Florida
St. Louis Hawks draft picks
Wilmington Blue Bombers players